Julius Fürst (12 May 1805, Żerków, South Prussia – 9 February 1873, Leipzig), born Joseph Alsari, was a Jewish German orientalist and the son of noted maggid, teacher, and Hebrew grammarian Jacob Alsari. Fürst was a distinguished scholar of Semitic languages and literature. During his years as professor in the department of oriental languages and literature at the University of Leipzig (1864–1873), he wrote many works on literary history and linguistics.

Biography 
At an early age, Fürst had a remarkable knowledge of Hebrew literature, Old Testament scriptures and oriental languages. In 1825, after having studied at Berlin, where Hegel and Neander were among his teachers, he took a course in Jewish theology at Posen. In 1829, after having abandoned his Jewish orthodoxy, he went to Breslau, and in 1831 to Halle. Here he took his degree in oriental languages and theology under Gesenius in 1832.<ref name=je>Jewish Encyclopedia Bibliography:
Delitzsch, [https://books.google.com/books?id=XKc-AAAAcAAJ&pg=PA17 'Zur Gesch. der Jüdischen Poesie, p. 124], where a didactic poem of Fürst's, "Ḥoḳ we-Emunah," composed "from his 14th-22d year," is mentioned, and which is not otherwise known;
Fürst, Bibl. Jud. i. 306 et seq.;
Hilberg, Illustrierte Monatshefte, i. 133 et seq.;
Steinschneider, Hebr. Bibl. xiii. 140.</ref>

In 1833 he became a journalist in Leipzig, later securing a position as tutor and lecturer (privat-docent) in the university there (lecturing on Chaldaic, Syriac, Hebrew grammar and literature, Biblical exegesis, etc.), from which position he was promoted in 1864 to professor of oriental languages and literature. He filled this post until his death, and during his tenure there he was also elected to several scientific societies.

As one of the exponents of the University of Leipzig's academic scholarly milieu throughout his adult life he was also a contemporary, a friend, and a sometimes collaborator of Leipzig's own native Lutheran scholar and professor Franz Delitsch. Fürst was 8 years Delitsch's senior.

Fürst was chief editor of Der Orient (Leipzig 1840-1851), a periodical dedicated to scientific study of the language, literature and history of the Jews.

 Works 
 Lehrgebäude der aramaischen Idiome (“A system for Aramic dialects,” 1835)
 Concordantiae librorum Sacrorum veteris Testamenti Hebraicae et Chaldaicae (1837–40)
 Kultur and Literaturgeschichte der Juden in Asien (“Cultural and literary history of Jews in Asia,” 1849)
 Hebräisches und Chaldäisches Handwörterbuch (“Portable dictionary for Hebrew and Chaldaic,” 1857-61)
 Geschichte des Karäerthums (1862–65)
 
 
 
 Geschichte der biblischen Litteratur und des jüdisch-hellenistischen Schrifttums'' (“History of Biblical literature and Jewish-Hellenic writings,” 1867-70)

References

External links 
 
Encyclopaedia Judaica (2007) entry on "Fuerst, Julius." 
Literature by and about Julius Fürst in University Library JCS Frankfurt am Main: Digital Collections Judaica
 Digitized works by Julius Fürst at the Leo Baeck Institute, New York
 

1805 births
1873 deaths
German orientalists
Jewish scientists
19th-century German Jews
Bibliographers of Hebrew literature
Academic staff of Leipzig University
University of Breslau alumni
University of Halle alumni
German male non-fiction writers